The Pander S-4 Postjager was a 1930s Dutch three-engined mailplane designed and built by Pander & Son. Only one was built which was destroyed during the MacRobertson Air Race.

Design and development
The S-4 was designed as a fast mailplane for the service between the Netherlands and the Dutch East Indies. It was a three-seat low-wing monoplane powered by three  Wright Whirlwind radial engines. It had a conventional retractable landing gear with a tailwheel. The S-4, registered PH-OST, first flew on 6 October 1933.

Operational history
In December 1933 it flew a mail flight to Batavia. In 1934 the S-4 was entered into the MacRobertson Air Race between London and Melbourne. It left Mildenhall in England on 20 October 1934 and after 36 hours arrived at Allahabad, India. The aircraft was delayed when the landing gear was badly damaged on arrival at Allahabad. It was ready to leave on 26 October but while taxiing for departure it hit a motor car and burst into flames and was destroyed; the crew jumped out and escaped injury.

Specifications

References

Further reading

1930s Dutch mailplanes
S-004
Trimotors
Low-wing aircraft
Aircraft first flown in 1933